Lord Kitchener Wants You is a 1914 advertisement by Alfred Leete which was developed into a recruitment poster. It depicted Lord Kitchener, the British Secretary of State for War, above the words "WANTS YOU". Kitchener, wearing the cap of a British Field Marshal, stares and points at the viewer calling them to enlist in the British Army against the Central Powers. The image is considered one of the most iconic and enduring images of World War I. A hugely influential image and slogan, it has also inspired imitations in other countries.

Development 
 
British policy for a century had been that recruitment to the British armed forces was strictly volunteer. Before the outbreak of the First World War, recruiting posters had not been used in Britain on a regular basis since the Napoleonic Wars. UK government advertisements for contract work were handled by His Majesty's Stationery Office, who passed this task onto the publishers of R. F. White & Sons in order to avoid paying the government rate to newspaper publishers. As war loomed in late 1913, the number of advertising contracts expanded to include other firms. J. E. B. Seely, then the Secretary of State for War, awarded Hedley Le Bas, Eric Field, and their Caxton Advertising Agency a contract to advertise for recruits in the major UK newspapers. Eric Field designed a prototype full-page advertisement with the coat of arms of King George V and the phrase "Your King and Country Need You." Britain declared war on the German Empire on 4 August 1914 and the first run of the full-page advert ran the next day in those newspapers owned by Lord Northcliffe.

The Prime Minister H. H. Asquith appointed Kitchener as Secretary of State for War in August 1914. Kitchener was the first currently serving soldier to hold the post and was given the task of recruiting a large army to fight Germany. Unlike some of his contemporaries who expected a short conflict, Kitchener foresaw a much longer war requiring hundreds of thousands of enlistees. According to Gary S. Messinger, Kitchener reacted well to Field's advertisement, although he insisted "that the ads should all end with 'God Save the King' and that they should not be changed from the original text, except to say 'Lord Kitchener needs YOU.'" In the following months, Le Bas formed an advisory committee of ad men to develop further newspaper recruiting advertisements, most of which ran vertically , two columns wide.

Alfred Leete, one of Caxton's illustrators, designed the now-famous image of Kitchener as the cover illustration for the 5 September 1914 issue of London Opinion, a popular weekly magazine, taking cues from Field's earlier recruiting advertisement.  At the time, the magazine, which sold for one penny, had a circulation of around 300,000. 

In response to requests for reproductions, the magazine offered postcard-sized copies for sale - at 100 for 1s 4 d "post free". It advertised these alongside other post cards from cartoons published in  the London Opinion  The Parliamentary Recruiting Committee obtained permission to use the design in poster form. A similar poster used the words "YOUR COUNTRY NEEDS YOU".

In September a poster printed by Victoria House and credited to the London Opinion carried the image of Kitchener below "Britons" and above "Wants You" "Join your Country's Army! God, Save The King". In November David Allen and Sons printed the same Kitchener image with "your country needs you" on a recruitment poster below the allied flags alongside details of rates of pay and exhortations to join. Although David Allen were printers for the Parliamentary Recruiting Committee it was not an official publication, lacking design number and the PRC endorsement. 

Kitchener, a "figure of absolute will and power, an emblem of British masculinity", was a natural subject for Leete's artwork as his name was directly attached to the recruiting efforts and the newly-forming Kitchener's Army. Le Bas of Caxton Advertising (for whom Leete worked) chose Kitchener for the advertisement because Kitchener was "the only soldier with a great war name, won in the field, within the memory of the thousands of men the country wanted." Kitchener made his name in the Sudan Campaign, avenging the death of General Gordon with brutality and efficiency. He became a hero of "New Imperialism" alongside other widely regarded figures in Britain like Field Marshal Wolseley and Field Marshal Roberts. Kitchener's appearance including his bushy moustache and court dress jacket was reminiscent of romanticized Victorian era styles. After the scorched earth tactics and hard-fought victory of the Second Boer War, Kitchener represented a return to the military victories of the colonial era. The fact that Kitchener's name was not used in the poster demonstrates how easily he was visually recognized. David Lubin opines that the image may be one of the earliest successful celebrity endorsements as the commercial practice expanded greatly in the 1920s. Keith Surridge posits that Kitchener's features evoked the harsh, feared militarism of the Germans, which boded well for British fortunes in the war. Kitchener did not see the end of the war; he died when the cruiser HMS Hampshire carrying him and a delegation to Russia struck a German mine and sank in 1916.

Impact 

Leete's drawing of Kitchener was the most famous image used in the British Army recruitment campaign of World War I. It continues to be considered a masterful piece of wartime propaganda as well as an enduring and iconic image of the war.

Recruitment posters in general have often been seen as a driving force helping to bring more than a million men into the Army. September 1914, coincident with publication of Leete's image, saw the highest number of volunteers enlisted. The Times recorded the scene in London on 3 January 1915; "Posters appealing to recruits are to be seen on every hoarding, in most windows, in omnibuses, tramcars and commercial vans. The great base of Nelson's Column is covered with them. Their number and variety are remarkable. Everywhere Lord Kitchener sternly points a monstrously big finger, exclaiming 'I Want You'".  One contemporaneous publication decried the use of advertising methods to enlist soldiers: "the cold, basilisk eye of a gaudily-lithographed Kitchener rivets itself upon the possible recruit and the outstretched finger of the British Minister of War is levelled at him like some revolver, with the words, 'I want you.' The idea is stolen from the advertisement of a 5c. American cigar." Although it became one of the most famous posters in history, its widespread circulation did not halt the decline in recruiting.
 The use of Kitchener's image for recruiting posters was so widespread that Lady Asquith referred to the Field Marshal simply as "the Poster."
The placement of the Kitchener posters including Alfred Leete's design has been examined and questioned following an Imperial War Museum publication in 1997. The museum suggested that the poster itself was a "non event" and was made popular by postwar advertising by the war museum, perhaps conflating Leete's design with the so-called "30-word" poster, an official product from the Parliamentary Recruitment Committee.
The 30-word design was the most popular recruitment poster at the time, having been printed ten times more than Leete's image. Leete's image has been praised for being more arresting, while his accompanying text is also far less verbose. The official wording, taken from a Kitchener speech, may seem more fitting for a character in a Henry James novel. The 30-word recruiting poster was developed as Britons' collective hopes of the war being over by Christmas were dashed in January 1915 and volunteer enlistments fell.
A 2013 book researched by James Taylor counters the popular belief that the Leete design was an influential recruitment tool during the war. He claims the original artwork was acquired by the Imperial War Museum in 1917 and catalogued as a poster in error. Though the image of Kitchener (Britain's most popular soldier) inspired several other poster designs, Taylor says he can find no evidence that the poster was as popular or influential as later stated having examined many contemporary photographs, although a photograph from 15 December 1914 taken at the Lancashire and Yorkshire Railway station in Liverpool clearly depicts Leete's depiction among other recruiting posters.

The effectiveness of the image upon the viewer is attributed to what E. B. Goldstein has called the "differential rotation effect". Because of this effect, Kitchener's eyes and his foreshortened arm and hand appear to follow the viewer regardless of the viewer's orientation to the artwork. Historian Carlo Ginzburg compared Leete's image of Kitchener to similar images of Christ and Alexander the Great as depicting the viewer's contact with a powerful figure. Pearl James commented on Ginzburg's analysis agreeing that the strength of the connotation lies with a clever use of discursive psychology and that art historical methods better illuminate why this image has such resonance. The capitalized word "YOU" grabs the reader, bringing them directly to Kitchener's message. The textual focus on "you" engages the reader about their own participation in the war. Nicholas Hiley differs in that Leete's portrayal of Kitchener is less about immediate recruiting statistics but the myth that has grown around the image, including ironic parodies. Leete's Kitchener poster caught the attention of a then eleven-year-old George Orwell, who may have used it as the basis for his description of the "Big Brother" posters in his novel 1984. It remains recognised and parodied in popular culture.

In 1997 the British Army created a recruiting advertisement re-using Leete's image but substituting for Kitchener's face that of a British Army non-commissioned officer of African descent. Leete's image of Kitchener is featured on a 2014 £2 coin produced by sculptor John Bergdahl for the Royal Mint.  The coin was the first of a five-year series to commemorate the centennial of the war.  Use of Leete's image of Kitchener has been criticized by some for its pro-war connotation in light of the human losses of the First World War and the violence of Kitchener's campaign in Sudan. In July 2014, one of only four original posters known to exist went to auction for more than £10,000. The other three originals exist on display in State Library Victoria, the Museum of Brands, Packaging and Advertising, and the Imperial War Museum. Leete's design was also used for a corn maze in the Skylark Garden Centre in Wimblington to mark the centenary of World War I.

Original copies of the poster are rare compared to official PRC posters that were produced in up to a hundred thousand copies. The IWM, established in 1917, did not receive a copy for its collection until the 1950s. Leete's original artwork for the magazine cover version was exhibited alongside war posters in 1919 and donated to the IWM. In 1968 reproductions were printed by the Curwen Press for HMSO and these may have contributed to its later popularity.

Imitations 
The image of Lord Kitchener with his hand pointing directly at the viewer has inspired numerous imitations:

See also 
 Recruitment to the British Army during the First World War

References

Citations

Bibliography

Further reading

External links

British culture
1914 in the United Kingdom
British political phrases
Cultural history of World War I
1910s neologisms
Quotations from military
Propaganda posters
Military recruitment
Cultural depictions of Herbert Kitchener, 1st Earl Kitchener
Political posters of the United Kingdom